Mehrzad or Meherzad (Persian: مهرزاد) is a Persian name which has a meaning related to the Yazata Mithra. Mehr (مهر) means "sun" and zād (زاد) means "born of". So the literal meaning of Mehrzād (مهرزاد) is born of sun.

See also
Mehr (name)
Meher (disambiguation)
Meherazad

References

Persian words and phrases
Zoroastrianism